Regal Hotels International (RHI) is one of the largest hotel groups in Hong Kong. Regal Hotels International Holdings Limited is a company incorporated in Bermuda and listed on the Hong Kong Stock Exchange.

Ownership
The company is controlled by its chairman and managing director, Mr Lo Yuk Sui, who speaks for 52.84% of the issued share capital as at 31 December 2005. Lo is the second son of Great Eagle matriarch Lo To Lee-kwan (born 1918).

REIT
In October 2006, the company announced plans to sell and separately list its hotel properties in a Real Estate Investment Trust. However, as the Sunlight REIT spun off by Henderson Land Development fell by 6.5% on its market debut on 21 December, Regal chose to delay its offer.

On 13 March 2007, Regal announced its public offer for sale of up to 50 percent in Regal Hotels Real Estate Investment Trust, to be co-sponsored by Deutsche Bank, Goldman Sachs and Merrill Lynch, and raised HK$2.3 billion.

Hotels

Hong Kong
Regal Airport Hotel, at the Hong Kong International Airport
Regal Hongkong Hotel, in Causeway Bay
Regal Kowloon Hotel, in Tsim Sha Tsui East
Regal Oriental Hotel, in Kowloon City (formerly called Regal Kai Tak)
Regal Riverside Hotel, in Sha Tin
iclub Hotel, in Wan Chai
iclub Sheung Wan Hotel, in Sheung Wan
iclub Fortress Hill Hotel, in Fortress Hill
iclub Ma Tau Wan Hotel, in Ma Tau Wai
iclub Mong kok Hotel, in Mong Kok

Shanghai

 Regal International East Asia Hotel
 Regal Shanghai East Asia Hotel
 Regal Jinfeng Hotel
 Regal Plaza Hotel & Residence

Dezhou

 Regal Kangbo Hotel
 Regal Kangbo Hotel and Residence

Former hotels

Regal Constellation Hotel, a large property near Pearson International Airport in Toronto, Ontario built in 1962. Due to declining trade, the hotel was sold to Hospitality Investors Group of Scottsdale, Arizona in 2004 for redevelopment. Now owned by Park'N Fly, the hotel was demolished in 2011–2012 and is currently a vacant lot.
Regal Bostonian Hotel, a property opposite Faneuil Hall in downtown Boston opened in 1981. Regal bought the hotel in 1996 and sold it to Millennium & Copthorne Hotels in 2002. Now operates as Millennium The Bostonian.
Regal McCormick Ranch, a property in the master-planned community of McCormick Ranch in Scottsdale, Arizona.

References

External links
 Regal Hotels International

Companies listed on the Hong Kong Stock Exchange
Hospitality companies of Hong Kong
Hotel chains in China
Hong Kong brands